The 36th German Skeleton Championship 2002 was organized on 6 January 2002 in Altenberg.

Men

Women

See also
Skeleton (sport)

External links 
 Resultlist at the BSD Site 

Skeleton championships in Germany
2002 in German sport
2002 in skeleton
Sport in Altenberg, Saxony
2000s in Saxony